Borchardt is a surname. Notable people with the surname include:

 Alice Borchardt (1939-2007), American writer of historical fiction, fantasy and horror
 Carl Wilhelm Borchardt (1817-1880), German mathematician
 Curtis Borchardt (born 1980), American basketball player
 Diane Borchardt, American teacher and criminal, focus of the 1995 film Seduced by Madness
 Dietrich Borchardt (1916-1997), Australian librarian and bibliographer
 Erich Borchardt (1913-1944), Oberfeldwebel in the Wehrmacht
 Francis J. Borchardt, American politician
 Georges Borchardt, American literary agent
 Herbert Borchardt (1914-1944), Leutnant of the Reserves in the Wehrmacht
 Hugo Borchardt (1844-1924), German firearms inventor and engineer
 Jan-Christoph Borchardt (born 1989), German open source interaction designer
 Jon Borchardt (born 1957), American football guard
 Julian Borchardt (1868-1932),  socialist activist
 Karol Olgierd Borchardt (1905-1986), Polish writer and captain
 Knut Borchardt (born 1929), German researcher
 Ludwig Borchardt (1863-1938), German Egyptologist
 Mark Borchardt (born 1966), American independent filmmaker
 Paul Borchardt (1886-1953), German archaeologist
 Siegfried Borchardt (born 1953),  German neo-Nazi politician
 Simone Borchardt (born 1967), German politician
 Susan King Borchardt (born 1981), American basketball player

See also
 7.65×25mm Borchardt,
 Borchardt C-93 (1844-1921)
 Sharps-Borchardt Model 1878
 STS Kapitan Borchardt,  Polish sail training ship
 Burchard (disambiguation)

Surnames from given names